Karel Kuthan (24 September 1900 – 22 December 1962) was a Czech architect. His work was part of the architecture event in the art competition at the 1948 Summer Olympics.

References

1900 births
1962 deaths
20th-century Czech architects
Olympic competitors in art competitions
Place of birth missing